The Atla Religion Database (ATLA RDB) is an index of academic journal articles in the area of religion. It is updated monthly and published by the American Theological Library Association. The database indexes articles, essays, and book reviews related to a wide range of scholarly fields related to religion. The database is available on a subscription basis through a database aggregator.

The total database includes over 3.0 million article citations from over 2,400+ journals. There are more than a quarter of a million essay citations from more than 18,000 multi-author works. The number of book reviews is over half a million. Atla indexes multi-author works, such as Festschriften and conference proceedings, with separate records for each essay.

Formats 
The Atla Religion Database, formerly available on CD-ROM, is a MARC record format database that incorporates several out-of-print indexes, including Religion Index One: Periodicals, Religion Index Two: Multi-Author Works, and Index to Book Reviews in Religion.

Coverage 
The database indexes scholarly works on major world religions. There are, however, selection criteria for inclusion according to scholarly merit and scope. More than 60 languages are represented. Some records cover articles as far back as the 19th century. Atla claims full coverage for core journals back to 1949.

In 1996 Susan Smailes' masters thesis criticized Atla Religion Database for under-representing the emerging fields of lesbian theology and womanist theology in its coverage.

Scholarly fields with significant degrees of coverage include:

 Ancient history
 Anthropology
 Archaeology
 Bible
 Church history
 Ethics
 Mission 
 Philosophy
 Pastoral ministry
 Religious studies
 Theology
 Human Culture & Society 
 Ecumenism
 World religions

See also
List of academic databases and search engines

References

External links 
 

Bibliographic databases and indexes
Year of establishment missing
Religion databases